Aperiovula is a genus of sea snails, marine gastropod mollusks in the family Ovulidae, the ovulids, cowry allies or false cowries.

This genus has become a synonym of Pseudosimnia Schilder, 1927

Species
Species within the genus Apriovula include:
Aperiovula adriatica (Sowerby, 1828): synonym of Pseudosimnia adriatica (G. B. Sowerby I, 1828) 
Aperiovula juanjosensii Perez & Gomez, 1987: synonym of Pseudosimnia juanjosensii (Pérez & Gómez, 1987) (original combination)

References

External links
 Nomenclator Zooloogicus info

Ovulidae